is a Japanese historical romance manga series written and illustrated by Kaoru Mori. It was first serialized in Enterbrain's Harta (formerly known as Fellows!) magazine from October 2008 to November 2020, after which it transferred to Kadokawa's  magazine in June 2021. Its serial chapters have been collected into fourteen bound volumes as of October 2022. Yen Press licensed the series for an English-language release in North America.

Synopsis
Set in a rural town near the Caspian Sea during the Russian conquest of Central Asia in the late 19th century, A Bride's Story revolves around a young woman, Amira, who travels from a distant village across the mountains to marry Karluk, a young man eight years her junior. The series follows their relationship as it develops, while introducing storylines about other young women and their daily lives with their respective fiancés and husbands along the Silk Road, and their struggle to keep on their livinghood amidst the advance of the Russian Empire's army.

Characters

Eihon family
The Eihon family descended from nomads, but have lived in a village for several generations. The family is largely patrilocal, but Yusuf, a son-in-law, married into the family.

A twenty-year-old woman and Karluk's bride. She stems from a different (semi-nomadic) tribe. She is skilled in archery, horse-riding, and hunting. A free-spirited, adventurous woman, she is more open and outgoing in her day-to-day activities compared with the rest of the women in the family, who are noticeably more reserved. Despite the noticeable age gap between her and Karluk, she genuinely loves him. Unknown to Amira, some of the men she encounters look down on her because she is considered old for a new bride, and long past the traditional age when women in the society have started having children.

Amira's twelve-year-old husband. He is the youngest son of Akunbek and Sanira. He works very hard to be a good traditional husband to Amira, but because of his young age, he struggles to form a closer relationship with her. Karluk is considered an oddity in that he is younger than his bride; traditionally the bride is usually many years younger than the groom. Some men treat Karluk with pity since they fear that his wife will be too old when he is mature enough to have children with her.

Karluk's grandfather.

Karluk's grandmother who hails from the same clan as Amira and was at least acquainted with Amira's father prior to her marriage to Mahatbek. Naturally, she is very protective of Amira. Like Amira, she is a skillful archer and rider and remains a fearsome individual despite her advanced age. She is nonetheless a loving matriarch who practices her own brand of tough love. As a firm believer in the importance of needlework, she guides both Pariya and Tileke in realising both the necessity of the skill and the matriarchal history that is passed down through it.  

Karluk's father. Serves as one of the village elders due to his wealth and status. While he is a traditional man, he is also very understanding and very supportive of Karluk and Amira's marriage.

Karluk's mother.

Yusuf's wife and Karluk's elder sister. She is often surprised by Amira's carefree and spontaneous personality. She patiently explains to Amira when their tribal customs differ. Her three sons often exasperate her with their rowdiness, but she loves them all the same.

Karluk's brother-in-law. Seleke's husband. He lives with his wife's family and is a loving yet reasonable father.

Daughter of Seleke and Yusuf, and Karluk's niece. As the elder sister of three rowdy brothers, she is more assertive and bossy around them. She loves falcons and is very talented at embroidering. 
The eldest, middle, and youngest sons of Seleke and Yusuf, respectively, and Karluk's nephews. The trio are playful and rambunctious. Though not malicious, Torkcan and Chalg can go overboard in teasing Rostem, causing him to cry and prompting Yusuf to step in.

An English traveler and researcher who lives with the Eihon family. He has been researching the customs, language, and culture of the tribes and peoples. He later leaves the town to visit his friend in Ankara and acquire a camera so that he can record the cultures and people he comes across.

Residents of the town

A young woman who is introduced in chapter 6; attracted to Amira's free-spirited nature, the two become good friends. Pariya has always struggled to be a traditional woman in the society, but her habit of speaking her mind regardless of situation creates a lot of uncomfortable situations. As a result, she tends to become anxious in social situations, which results in embarrassing outbursts. She is very good at baking and skilled at creating extremely elaborate designs in her bread, which she teaches to Amira. Her father is Togo, a potter, who feels rather resigned at trying to find a suitable husband for his daughter because her outspoken nature tends to scare off potential suitors. This changes when she is betrothed to Umar, much to her joy, but she becomes anxious trying to act more mature and reliable in order to please him, which sometimes leads to unexpected results.
Pariya also appears in a short-comic spin-off of the series called "Pariya-san wa Otoshigoro".

An old man who raises sheep, and told of wolves living around Soma Lake. Introduced in chapter 1.

A lovely young woman in the village who is well-regarded because she is skillful at domestic tasks and is well-mannered and good-natured. She is known to have many suitors. Pariya aspires to more like her as she perceives Kamola to be an ideal young woman and tries to discreetly to observe her. When Kamola believes that she has inadvertently angered Pariya due to Pariya's behavior, Pariya admits that she actually looks up to Kamola, who in turn confesses that she admires Pariya's ability to speak her mind. Through Amira's encouragement, Pariya and Kamola become friends.

Halgal family
The family Amira was born into. They are nomadic during the summer. Introduced in chapter 4.

Amira's eldest brother, a serious and stoic man. He is a respectful individual who addresses Balkirsh as an "esteemed mother" and Karluk as an "honoured brother". He is not present during Amira's wedding, a conspicuous absence that Amira's father-in-law brings up. He struggles between loyalty to his clan and affection for his sister. Though he does not openly oppose his clan's orders, he has expressed frustration over the decisions of his elders. Although he goes along with the attack on Amira's village, he is quick to defend the villagers the moment his clan is betrayed by the Balkans. Initially mistaken for an enemy, he is saved by the village women's intercession. He becomes the leader of the Halgal clan after his father's death in the battle against Amira's village.

A maternal cousin of Amira and Azel. His clothing differs from Azel and Baimat's because he is a maternal, not paternal, relative. His deadpan sense of humour and preoccupation with food make him appear more flippant than he is. He disagrees with the clan elders on many matters but does not bother voicing his sentiments because he understands it is futile. This does not stop him from trying to convince Azel to persuade Azel's father, the clan leader, from abandoning the idea to marry Amira to the Numaji as he knows that the Numaji are physically, often fatally, violent to their women. He wants to marry, but understands that the current state of his clan makes it difficult to attract any brides.

A paternal cousin of Amira and Azel. Unlike Joruk, Baimat is reserved, stoic, and dependable. He has a stricter sense of morality compared to Joruk and calls the latter out for filching some apricots from a tree in Amira's village. However, like Azel and Joruk, he privately disagrees with the clan elders. He is shown to be a perceptive and encouraging individual, correctly assessing Karluk's feelings towards hunting and Amira, while cheering him up after he makes mistakes while learning to hunt.

One of Amira and Azel's younger sisters. Amira describes her as lively and healthy, recalling that Aterui had never been sick. Her death after marrying the Numaji comes as a sudden shock to Amira, but Joruk reveals that she was beaten to death, presumably by her husband. Joruk elaborates that the beating was so severe that her bones shattered, while the matriarch Balkirsh confirms that the Numaji are a violent, barbaric bunch.

Another one of Amira, Aterui, and Azel's younger sisters. Like Aterui, she dies shortly after marrying the Numaji. She is heavily implied to have been a victim of domestic abuse. Her death shocks Amira, as she was alive prior to Amira's marriage. Aterui and Karahiga both die within a year of Amira's wedding.

Other characters

A clan notorious for their wealth and brutality.

A young nomadic woman living with her mother-in-law. Introduced in chapter 12. Married into her current family at age sixteen, but in a few years became a widow of all its five sons as per tradition, which dictates that a widow with no children marries one of her husband's brothers. Since her father-in-law also died, she helps and keeps company to her mother-in-law instead of going back to her own family. She becomes romantically involved with Mr. Smith, and eventually follows him to Ankara.

An old nomadic woman. She wishes for Talas to have a future with a loving husband and won't accept any marriage offers that would make her daughter-in-law unhappy, including the one from her uncle. She tries to convince Smith to marry Talas, but fails. Later marries Talas's uncle in order to secure a good match for her.

The brother of Talas's father-in-law. A wealthy, aggressive man that wants Talas to be a second wife for his son. He reports Smith to the town's authorities which leads to Smith's arrest and later marries Talas's mother-in-law.

 Smith's guide to Ankara. Introduced in chapter 15. He is associated with the local military, and unabashedly greedy and resourceful, taking advantage of a situation as he sees fit. He is unmarried, but expresses interest in finding a wife when he feels he has obtained sufficient financial stability.

 Twin sisters from a thriving fishing village who are of marriageable age. They are very mischievous and are always together, sharing the same ideas about nearly everything. When Mr. Smith and Ali arrive in their village, Laila and Leyli have been causing trouble trying to find wealthy grooms for themselves who will also bend to their will. Their father later marries the two sisters to the first and second sons of one of his friends.

 Laila and Leyli's father is a fisherman who is strict with his children. He allows Mr. Smith to remain at his house believing he is a doctor. Though he wants to find good husbands for his daughters, he is reluctant to do so because he worries about the expense of dowries for both of them. The twins' mother, is also very strict with them, often having little patience for their antics and not hesitating to resort to severe methods to ensure they will be good wives someday. However, she cares for them deeply and it is implied she was very much like her daughters when she was young. The girls' family also includes several younger siblings, their maternal aunt, their grandfather, and their grandmother, who proves to be very adept at tricking the twins into doing household tasks.

 Sarmaan and Farsami are the eldest and second sons, respectively, of a fisherman, and both happen to be fishermen themselves. Their father is an old friend of Laila and Leyli's father and the brothers are childhood friends of the twins. When their father suggests that the twins marry the brothers, they are mostly indifferent and admit to have been expected it. When their fathers are too caught up with arguing about dowries, the brothers are arbitrarily matched to the twins so they will get to know each other better. Both brothers express a mature attitude towards marriage, and with both pairs satisfied with the matches, Sarm is paired with Laila, and Sami with Leyli.

 The young wife of a wealthy and kindhearted man living in Persia. She is the mother of a young son, Hasan. Smith and Ali are briefly guests in the home of Anis' husband, though Smith never sees Anis herself. Though Anis has everything she could have, she is isolated and lonely until her maid Maarfe encourages her to join her at the public baths. Anis forms an immediate connection with Sherine, with whom she hopes to form a bond of sisterhood with. 

 A taciturn woman married to a poor man and the mother of a son a little older than Hasan. Sherine becomes fond of Anis, finding her endearing. Shortly after she and Anis commit themselves as sisters, Sherine's husband dies because of an illness. Anis persuades her husband to take Sherine on as a second wife and her family joins the household.

 Pariya's suitor, a young man close to her age whose father raises sheep and runs a traveler's inn. A thoughtful and observant youth, he is skillful at a number of tasks, including calculating figures on an abacus. His father has been searching for a suitable bride for his son for some time and took notice of Pariya when she accompanied the Eihons to find Mr. Smith during his brief engagement to Talas. In contrast to Pariya's other suitors, Umar seems to like Pariya's outspokenness, though she is constantly flustered around him and becomes even more conscientious of her lack of gentle qualities, and Umar's father considers her liveliness to be a positive trait. When her town is severely damaged by the attack from the Halgals, Pariya and Umar's engagement is delayed.

Publication

A Bride's Story is written and illustrated by Kaoru Mori. It was first serialized in Enterbrain's  manga magazine Harta (formerly known as Fellows!) from 14 October 2008 to 13 November 2020. It transferred to Kadokawa's manga magazine  on 18 June 2021. The series' chapters have been collected into fourteen  volumes by Kadokawa as of 20 October 2022. The first nine volumes were published under Enterbrain's Beam Comix imprint; subsequent volumes have been published under Kadokawa's Harta Comix imprint. In addition to the  release, a wide-ban collector's edition of the manga has been issued by Kadokawa since 20 August 2021. The wide-ban features large pages, high-quality paper, fold-out color illustrations, and special boxes to store each volume in. A Bride's Story is also available in digital e-book format in Japan.

Yen Press licensed the series for an English-language release in North America. The first volume was published on 31 May 2011; the thirteenth and most recent volume was published on 19 April 2022. The series received a digital release starting on 25 September 2018.

A Bride's Story is also licensed for regional language releases by Ki-oon in France, Tokyopop Germany in Germany, J-Pop Manga in Italy, Norma Editorial in Spain, Studio JG in Poland, Punainen jättiläinen in Finland, Level Comics in Indonesia, Daewon C.I. in Korea, Kadokawa Taiwan in Taiwan, Siam Inter Comics in Thailand, and IPM in Vietnam.

Reception
A Bride's Story won the Manga Taishō Award in 2014. It was previously nominated for the award in 2011 and 2013. It was nominated for an Eisner Award in 2012 and 2016. The American Library Association's YALSA division included the first volume on its list of Great Graphic Novels For Teens in 2012.

References

External links
  
 Interview with Kaoru Mori, part 1 at Comic Natalie 
 Interview with Kaoru Mori, part 2 at Comic Natalie 

2008 manga
Comics set in the 19th century
Enterbrain manga
Historical anime and manga
Manga Taishō
Marriage in anime and manga
Romance anime and manga
Seinen manga
Slice of life anime and manga
Works about Central Asia
Yen Press titles